Uzma Zahid Bukhari (born 18 August 1976) is a Pakistani politician  & daughter of Zahid Bukhari who was a prosecutor in Raymond Davis case.

Early life and education
She was born on 18 August 1976 in Faisalabad to the former Justice of Lahore High Court Syed Zahid Hussain Bokhari.

She received her early education from Sheikhupura and earned a Bachelor of Arts from the Punjab University.

She earned Bachelor of Laws in 2001 from Pakistan College of Law and is practicing as a lawyer.

Political career

She was elected to the Provincial Assembly of the Punjab as a candidate of Pakistan Peoples Party (PPP) on a reserved seat for women in 2002 Pakistani general election.

She was re-elected to the Provincial Assembly of the Punjab as a candidate of PPP on a reserved seat for women in 2008 Pakistani general election.

In February 2013, she joined Pakistan Muslim League (N) (PML-N).

She was re-elected to the Provincial Assembly of the Punjab as a candidate of PML-N on a reserved seat for women in 2013 Pakistani general election.

She was re-elected to the Provincial Assembly of the Punjab as a candidate of PML-N on a reserved seat for women in 2018 Pakistani general election.

References

Living people
1976 births
Pakistani women lawyers
Punjab MPAs 2002–2007
Punjab MPAs 2008–2013
Punjab MPAs 2013–2018
Pakistan People's Party MPAs (Punjab)
Pakistan Muslim League (N) MPAs (Punjab)
Women members of the Provincial Assembly of the Punjab
People from Faisalabad
21st-century Pakistani women politicians